Vaya is a 2016 South African drama film directed by Akin Omotoso. It was screened in the Contemporary World Cinema section at the 2016 Toronto International Film Festival.

Cast
 Phuthi Nakene as Patricia
 Warren Masemola as Xolani
 Azwile Chamane-Madiba as Zodwa
 Nomonde Mbusi as Thobeka
 Harriet Manamela as Grace
 Sihle Xaba as Nhlanhla
 Zimkhitha Nyoka as Zanele
 Sibusiso Msimang as Nkulu

Reception
Review aggregation website Rotten Tomatoes gives the film an approval rating of 100% based on 6 reviews and an average rating of 10/10.

References

External links
 

2016 films
2016 drama films
South African drama films
Zulu-language films
Films directed by Akin Omotoso